The Anonymous Venetian can refer to:

The Anonymous Venetian (film), a film
The Anonymous Venetian (novel), a book by Donna Leon